A list of films produced in Argentina in 1977:

External links and references
 Argentine films of 1977 at the Internet Movie Database

1977
Argentine
Films